Lycée Chateaubriand may refer to:
 Lycée français Chateaubriand, a French international school in Rome, Italy
 , France